A Protected Procedure Call (PPC) is a messaging facility wherein messages are sent and received using procedure call interfaces.  They are a core component of the K42 operating system.

Inter-process communication
Subroutines